The Oltenița Water Tower is a water tower located at 2B Argeșului Street in Oltenița, Romania.

The 34.5-meter high octagonal tower  was the town’s first structure made of reinforced concrete. Bidding for the building contract took place in 1913, and it was completed in 1916. Shortly thereafter, it was bombed by the Central Powers in World War I. It was placed in service in 1922 and retired in 1977. It then served as a bar and later was used by homeless people. It was listed as a historic monument by Romania's Ministry of Culture and Religious Affairs in 1992. The tower was later used to host temporary art exhibitions, and as an art museum.

Notes 

Historic monuments in Călărași County
Water towers in Romania
Art museums and galleries in Romania
Towers completed in 1916